A revival house or repertory cinema is a cinema that specializes in showing classic or notable older films (as opposed to first run films).  Such venues may include standard repertory cinemas, multi-function theatres that alternate between old movies and live events, and some first-run theatres that show past favorites alongside current independent films.

List of revival houses

Canada
 Hamilton, The Westdale
 Hamilton, Playhouse Cinema
 London, Hyland Cinema
 Montréal, Cinéma du Parc
 Montréal, La Cinémathèque québécoise
 Montréal, Dollar Cinema
 Montréal, Cinéma Moderne
 Ottawa, ByTowne Cinema
 Ottawa, Mayfair Theatre
 Saskatoon Broadway Theatre
 Toronto, Bloor Cinema
 Toronto, Revue Cinema
 Toronto, Royal Cinema
 Vancouver, Rio Theatre
 Vancouver, The Cinematheque
 Winnipeg, Winnipeg Film Group's Cinematheque

United States
 Atlanta, Plaza Theatre
 Baltimore, The Charles Theatre
 Brooklyn, NY, Spectacle Theater
 Brooklyn, NY, Nitehawk Cinema
 Boston, Brattle Theatre
 Boston, Coolidge Corner Theatre
 Boston, Harvard Film Archive
 Chicago, Gene Siskel Film Center
 Chicago, Music Box Theatre
 Chicago, Doc Films
 Columbus, OH Gateway Film Center
 Columbus, OH Studio 35
 Dallas, Texas Theatre
 Denver, Sie FilmCenter
 Detroit, Redford Theatre
 Houston, Brown Theater
 Lexington, Kentucky Theater
 Los Angeles, Grauman's Egyptian Theatre
 Los Angeles, New Beverly Cinema
 Manhattan, NY, Anthology Film Archives
 Manhattan, NY, Film Forum
 Manhattan, NY, IFC Center
 Manhattan, NY, Metrograph
 Minneapolis, Trylon Cinema
 Omaha, NE, Dundee Theater
 Palo Alto, CA, Stanford Theatre
 Pittsburgh, PA, Row House Cinema
 Philadelphia, PA, Lightbox Film Center
 Philadelphia, PA, Philadelphia Film Center
 Philadelphia, PA, Roxy Theater
 Raleigh, NC, Colony Theater
 Rochester, NY, Dryden Theatre
 Saginaw, MI, Temple Theatre
 Santa Monica, Aero Theatre
 San Francisco, Castro Theater
 Seattle, Grand Illusion Cinema

Europe

United Kingdom
 Glasgow, Glasgow Film Theatre
 London, BFI Southbank
 London, Prince Charles Cinema
 London, Regent Street Cinema
 London, Close-Up Film Centre
 Coventry, Warwick Student Cinema

France
 Paris, 
 Paris, Le Champo
 Paris, Cinémathèque Française
 Paris, La Filmothèque
 Paris, Le Grand Action
 Paris, 
 Paris, Le Studio Saint-Michel

The Netherlands
 Rotterdam, WORM

Russia
 Moscow,

Poland
 Warsaw,

Romania
 Bucharest, Arhiva Nationala de Filme - Cinemateca

Australia
 Adelaide, Mercury Cinema (Adelaide Cinémathèque)
 Hobart, Rewind Cinema
 Melbourne, The Astor Theatre
 Melbourne, Sun Theatre
 Sydney, Randwick Ritz

Africa

South Africa
 Gardens, Cape Town, Labia Theatre
 Johannesburg, The Bioscope

Cinemas and movie theaters
Repertory cinemas